Voltastraße  is a Berlin U-Bahn station located on the .

After the completion of the Berlin Wall, line U8 was severely curtailed. In the north, only Voltastraße and Gesundbrunnen stations could be used by West Berliners. Thereafter U8 became a tiny line of two stations that was little used, a condition that lasted until 5 October 1977 when it was extended to Osloer Straße to interchange with line U9.

References

U8 (Berlin U-Bahn) stations
Buildings and structures in Mitte
Railway stations in Germany opened in 1930